The Jelerău is a left tributary of the river Cerna in Romania. It flows into the Cerna in the town Băile Herculane.

References

Rivers of Romania
Rivers of Caraș-Severin County